K. Asif (born Asif Karim; 14 June 1922 – 9 March 1971) was an Indian film director, film producer and screenwriter who is known for his epic film, Mughal-e-Azam (1960).

Early life
Asif was born in Etawah, Uttar Pradesh, India to parents Dr. Fazal Karim and Bibi Ghulam Fatima. Asif went to Bombay and later took the name K. Asif. He became a successful director.

Career
His directorial debut, Phool (1945), did very well at the box-office. In 1944, Asif planned to make a film called Mughal-e-Azam based on the life and times of Mughal Emperor Akbar the Great's court dancer, based on a Urdu novel 'Anarkali' written by Syed Imtiaz Ali Taj, with Chandramohan in the male lead and the then upcoming actress Nargis in the female lead. However, in 1946, before the production of the film could begin, the male lead, Chandramohan, died. At that time, Asif temporarily shelved the film until further notice. He produced the film Hulchul and released it in 1951.

At that time, Asif recast Mughal-e-Azam with Dilip Kumar in the male lead and Madhubala in the female lead and began the production of the film in the same year. In 1960, after twelve years in production, Mughal-e-Azam was released and became a huge hit at packed cinema houses across India.

After the release and success of Mughal-e-Azam, Asif planned yet another motion picture called Love and God, his first directorial venture to be made completely in color, and began production. The film was to star Guru Dutt in the male lead and Nimmi in the female lead. However, in 1964, when lead actor Guru Dutt died, shooting came to a halt. Asif recast Sanjeev Kumar in the male lead and resumed production of the film. During the production of the film, K. Asif died on 9 March 1971 at the age of 48/49 and the film was abandoned. In 1986, Asif's senior widow, Akhtar Asif, (younger sister of Dilip Kumar) released the film in an incomplete form.

Personal life
K. Asif married four times. His first wife was a lady who was approved of and welcomed by his family. She remained married to him until her death, despite his other marriages, and was the mother of six of Asif's children.

Asif's second wife was the singer and actress Sitara Devi. The marriage between them happened in unusual circumstances. Asif had a sister, Sikandar Begum, who was married to her first cousin, the actor Nazir Ahmed Khan (not to be confused with the actor Nasir Khan, brother of Dilip Kumar). Nazir Ahmed Khan fell in love with Sitara Devi and married her while still being married to Sikandar Begum; as a Muslim man in India, he could have up to four wives concurrently. Asif became enamoured of Sitara Devi, who was his sister's co-wife and his cousin's second wife. Nazir and Sitara were soon divorced, and shortly afterwards, Asif married Sitara, who thus became the wife, successively, of Sikandar Begum's husband and brother.

However, the marriage of Asif and Sitara lasted no more than a few months, and they were soon divorced. This happened because by then, Asif had fallen in love with the actress Nigar Sultana, who played the important role of Bahaar in Asif's magnum opus, Mughal-e-Azam. Asif divorced Sitara Devi, apparently at her insistence, and married Nigar Sultana. Born in Hyderabad in south India, Nigar Sultana had previously been married to the actor S.M. Yousuf. That marriage had been childless and had ended in divorce when Yousuf moved to Pakistan some years after the partition of India. Asif and Nigar Sultana became the parents of a daughter, the small-time actress Heena Kausar, who appeared in bit roles in a number of forgettable films. She finally attained fame in 1991, by becoming the second wife of dreaded underworld gangster Iqbal Mirchi, a close associate of India's most wanted criminal, Dawood Ibrahim. Among other crimes, Iqbal Mirchi is said to have been a drug-dealer and to have laundered Dawood Ibrahim's ill-gotten wealth through his "successful business ventures."

Asif's fourth and last wife was Akhtar, the younger sister of actor Dilip Kumar. Asif and Akhtar became acquainted with each other since Asif used to visit Dilip Kumar's house frequently during the making of Mughal-i-Azam. It is said that Dilip Kumar was extremely unhappy about his sister marrying Asif, and the consequent rift between Dilip Kumar and Asif never healed. Akhtar Begum and Asif remained married until his death in 1971. It was Akhtar Begum who ensured the completion and release of Asif's last movie, "Love and God," which was released in 1986, fifteen years after Asif's death.

Filmography

Director
 Phool (1945)
 Mughal-e-Azam (1960)
 Sastaa Khoon, Mehanga Paani (1986) (incomplete)
 Love And God (1986) (incomplete)

Producer
 Hulchul (1951)
 Mughal-e-Azam (1960)
 Kamashashtra

Screenwriter
 Mughal-e-Azam (1960)

Awards
 1960: Filmfare Award for Best Film – Mughal-e-Azam
 1960: Filmfare Award for Best Director – Mughal-e-Azam: Nominated
 1960: President's  for Best Feature Film in Hindi – Mughal-e-Azam

Bibliography

References

External links

1922 births
1971 deaths
20th-century Indian film directors
Hindi-language film directors
Film producers from Mumbai
Indian male screenwriters
People from Etawah
Aligarh Muslim University alumni
Filmfare Awards winners
Film directors from Mumbai
Hindi film producers
Film producers from Uttar Pradesh
Film directors from Uttar Pradesh
20th-century Indian screenwriters
20th-century Indian male writers